Robin P. Fawcett (1937) is a British linguist known as the main exponent of the Cardiff grammar in systemic functional linguistics. He is Emeritus Professor at Cardiff University.

Selected bibliography 
Books

 Cognitive Linguistics and Social Interaction (1980)
 Invitation to Systemic Functional Linguistics through the Cardiff Grammar (1997)
 A theory of syntax for systemic functional linguistics (2000)

Papers

 'The semantics of clause and verb for relational processes in English' (1987)
 'What makes a "good" system network good?' (1988)
 'A generationist approach to grammar reversibility in Natural Language Processing' (1994)
 'A Systemic Functional approach to complementation in English' (1996)
 'On the subject of the Subject in English: two positions on its meaning (and on how to test for it)' (1999)
 'In place of Halliday's "verbal group"' (2000)

References 

Academics of Cardiff University
Semanticists
Syntacticians
Linguists from England
Systemic functional linguistics
Linguists of English
20th-century linguists
21st-century linguists
Computational linguistics researchers
1937 births
Living people